Aleksandar Nanev (born 9 November 1958) is a Bulgarian wrestler. He competed in the men's freestyle 82 kg at the 1988 Summer Olympics.

References

External links
 

1958 births
Living people
Bulgarian male sport wrestlers
Olympic wrestlers of Bulgaria
Wrestlers at the 1988 Summer Olympics
Sportspeople from Varna, Bulgaria